Beaver Creek may refer to one of nine rivers in Manitoba, Canada:
Beaver Creek, National Topographic System (NTS) map sheet 062J02
Beaver Creek, NTS map sheet 062I01
Beaver Creek, NTS map sheet 062K06
Beaver Creek, NTS map sheet 062I16
Beaver Creek, NTS map sheet 052M04
Beaver Creek, NTS map sheet 063F10
Beaver Creek, NTS map sheet 062P07
Beaver Creek, NTS map sheet 063C14
Beaver Creek, NTS map sheet 063C11

There is also an unincorporated place on Lake Winnipeg and Manitoba Provincial Road 234 called Beaver Creek; it is near the mouth of the Beaver Creek with CGNDB Unique Identifier GABZL. Beaver Creek Provincial Park is also nearby.

See also
List of rivers of Manitoba

References